The Baseball Federation of Cuba (Federación Cubana de Béisbol) is the governing body of the sport of baseball within Cuba. In 2018 a deal was struck between MLB and the Baseball Federation of Cuba was struck so that cuban baseball players no longer had to defect to play professional baseball., given the ban on all professional baseball in the country.

History

Baseball Federation of Cuba was established in 1938.

When the professional Cuban League was dismantled in 1961 after the dictatorship of Fidel Castro was established
, to be replaced by the amateur Cuban national baseball system administered by the Baseball Federation of Cuba.

See also 
Baseball in Cuba
Cuba national baseball team
Cuban baseball league system
Cuban National Series

References

External links
  (Spanish)

1938 establishments in Cuba
Sports organizations established in 1938
Baseball in Cuba
Baseball
Organizations based in Havana
Baseball governing bodies